Replication factor C subunit 2 is a protein that in humans is encoded by the RFC2 gene.

Function 

The elongation of primed DNA templates by DNA polymerase delta and epsilon requires the action of the accessory proteins, proliferating cell nuclear antigen (PCNA) and replication factor C (RFC). RFC, also called activator 1, is a protein complex consisting of five distinct subunits of 145, 40, 38, 37, and 36.5 kD. This gene encodes the 40 kD subunit, which has been shown to be responsible for binding ATP. Deletion of this gene has been associated with Williams syndrome. Alternatively spliced transcript variants encoding distinct isoforms have been described.

Interactions 

RFC2 has been shown to interact with BRD4, CHTF18, PCNA, RFC4 and RFC5.

References

Further reading